Ronan Carolino Falcão (born 7 May 1985), sometimes known simply as Ronan, is a former football who played as a central defender. Born in Brazil, he represented the Equatorial Guinea national team.

Club career

Early career

Ronan was born in Magé (Brazilian state of Rio de Janeiro) and began his career in Cruzeiro.

Citizen AA (2007–2008)
In August 2007, Hong Kong club Citizen AA signed Ronan on loan from Friburguense until the end of the season. He was given the number 2 shirt and became the first Equatoguinean player to play in Hong Kong First Division League. On 16 September 2007, Ronan made his official debut for Citizen in a 4–0 win over Rangers in a First Division match at Mong Kok Stadium.

While Ronan play as a left back for his national team, he has been mainly used as a centre back at Citizen. He has also played in the left midfield position due to injuries in his team's attacking line. On 29 March 2008, Ronan scored his first goal for Citizen with a header, helping the team to a 1–0 victory over Kitchee SC in the First Division. He subsequently scored another goal from a penalty kick on 5 April 2008 to help Citizen to come back to win 2–1 against South China AA. He then scored from another penalty kick in a 2–4 defeat to Eastern AA on 13 April 2008, taking his tally for the season to 3.

Ronan missed the FA Cup 2007–08 final after being sent off in the semi-final against Eastern AA on 5 May 2008 for receiving two yellow cards.  In the final, Citizen went on to win the cup with a 2–0 win over Wofoo Tai Po.

Germany
On 1 July 2009, Ronan signed with German Verbandsliga Sachsen-Anhalt club Lok Stendal.

International career 
Ronan made his Equatorial Guinea national team debut on 26 February 2006 in a friendly match against Benin in Cotonou. That day the National Nzalang (the nickname of Equatorial Guinea national football team) won by 1–0. On 1 June 2008, he scored the first goal in a 2–0 victory over Sierra Leone.

Ronan also played some friendly matches of category B between 2005 (vs. the team of Pará de Minas) and 2007 (vs. the Region of Murcia and Extremadura) and two in 2011 (vs. the French sides RSC Monteuil and FC Issy-les-Moulineaux).

International goals

Honours

Club 
Citizen AA
 Hong Kong FA Cup: 2007–08

International 
Equatorial Guinea
 CEMAC Cup: 2006

Career statistics

Club career

Current contract
28 March 2012 to 28 June 2012

Notes and references

External links 
 
 
 Ronan at HKFA Website
 
 
 Ronan at CitizenFC.com 

1985 births
Living people
Sportspeople from Rio de Janeiro (state)
Association football central defenders
Association football fullbacks
Equatoguinean footballers
Equatorial Guinea international footballers
Brazilian footballers
Hong Kong First Division League players
Citizen AA players
Campeonato Brasileiro Série D players
America Football Club (RJ) players

Cruzeiro Esporte Clube players
Friburguense Atlético Clube players
Centro de Futebol Zico players
Clube Atlético Tubarão players
Americano Futebol Clube players
Associação Botafogo Futebol Clube players
Ceres Futebol Clube players
Brazilian expatriate footballers
Brazilian expatriate sportspeople in Hong Kong
Expatriate footballers in Hong Kong
Brazilian expatriate sportspeople in Iran
Expatriate footballers in Iran
Naturalized citizens of Equatorial Guinea
People from Magé